Melliste is a settlement in Kastre Parish, Tartu County in eastern Estonia.

References 

Villages in Tartu County